Sophie Louise Floella Barker (born 25 December 1990) is an English footballer who plays as a defender or midfielder for Sheffield United currently on loan from Leicester City. She previously played for Lincoln Ladies, Sheffield and Doncaster Rovers Belles.

Club career
Barker scored "a fine strike" in Lincoln's 5–1 FA Women's Cup semi-final defeat by Arsenal before a record 3,000 crowd at Sincil Bank in March 2008. In the 2016 FA WSL season midfielder Barker was re-purposed as a full-back. Despite Doncaster's relegation, she adapted to the new role successfully, being awarded a new contract and named Manager's Player of the Season.

On 22 August, ahead of the 2020-21 FA Women's Championship season, Leicester City announced the signing of Barker, among a host of others, as the club embarked on their journey as a fully professional club.

References

External links
 Doncaster Rovers Belles player profile
 Sheffield FC Ladies player profile
 Lincolnshire FA coach profile
 

Living people
1990 births
English women's footballers
Women's association football midfielders
Women's Super League players
FA Women's National League players
Doncaster Rovers Belles L.F.C. players
Sportspeople from Lincoln, England
Notts County L.F.C. players
Sheffield F.C. Ladies players
Sheffield United W.F.C. players
Leicester City W.F.C. players